Stephens Lake Park is a park located in Columbia, Missouri.  Dating back to the early 19th century, the park contains structures that were built using slave labor.

Today it serves as an arboretum with a lake, and a park spanning 116 acres. It is often used as a live music venue..

History 
In 1818, a man by the name David Gordon built a cabin on the area that would become the park. In 1823, The David Gordon House and Collins Log Cabin were built using slave labor. After construction of the manor was complete, the Gordons turned their cabin into slave quarters .

The area was owned by the Gordon family for over a century.

According to a news article from KRCG, someone purposely set David Gordon House on fire on November 9, 1998.

The park was reopened in 2001. 

An amphitheatre in the park was opened on June 26, 2010.

Discovery Garden 

The park contains a garden called Darwin and Axie Hindman Discovery Garden, it was built to honor Darwin Hindman and Axie Hindman.

Wildlife 
Enchenopa binotata have been found at the park.

According to the Missouri Department of Conservation; Stephens lake contains species like Black Bass, Catfish, and Bluegill.

Stephens College purchase 
In 1926, the area was bought by Stephens College. 

The city of Columbia later purchased the park.

Concerts 
The Roots N Blues Festival is held annually in the park.

According to Concert archives, 8 concerts have taken place at the park.

Musicians like Dale Watson and Alejandro Escovedo performed concerts at the park in 2013.

Amos Lee and Rosanne Cash performed a concert in 2014.

References

Parks in Columbia, Missouri